Daniel Rezende Xavier (born 31 August 1982 in Belo Horizonte, Brazil) is a Brazilian archer. He competed in the individual event at the 2012 Summer Olympics.

References

External links
 

Brazilian male archers
1982 births
Living people
Archers at the 2012 Summer Olympics
Archers at the 2016 Summer Olympics
Olympic archers of Brazil
Sportspeople from Belo Horizonte
Archers at the 2011 Pan American Games
Archers at the 2015 Pan American Games
Pan American Games bronze medalists for Brazil
Pan American Games medalists in archery
South American Games gold medalists for Brazil
South American Games medalists in archery
Competitors at the 2014 South American Games
Medalists at the 2015 Pan American Games
21st-century Brazilian people